"Nagaredama" ("Stray bullet") is the third single by Japanese idol group Sakurazaka46 after their 2020 renaming. It was released on October 13, 2021. The title track features Tamura Hono as center. The music video was premiered on YouTube a month in advance of the single, on September 12, 2021. The single debuted atop the Oricon Singles Chart and the Billboard Japan Hot 100, selling over 375,000 copies in Japan in its first week of release.

Background and release
In August 2021, "Nagaredama" was announced for release on October 13, 2021. The choreography formation was introduced the next day, during Sakurazaka46's variety show Soko Magattara, Sakurazaka?. Hono Tamura succeeds centre position in the choreography for the title song from Hikaru Morita, along with Risa Watanabe and Hikaru Morita replacing Karin Fujiyoshi and Ten Yamasaki from centre positions on coupling tracks respectively. 

Rika Ozeki participated in the single after announcing her return from recuperating leave during the W-Keyaki Fes. 2021 in July. Yui Kobayashi took leave to recuperate, which was confirmed by the management committee in September 2021. Moreover, Akane Moriya and Rika Watanabe announced their departure from the group after the release of "Nagaredama".

Musician and columnist Azusa Ogiwara described the choreography as a bold, yet prudent change.

Music video
The music video was directed by Kazuma Ikeda, who previously directed the video for "Silent Majority" during the Keyakizaka46 period.

Track listing

Charts

Weekly charts

Year-end charts

Certifications

References

2021 singles
2021 songs
Sakurazaka46 songs
Sony Music Entertainment Japan singles
Oricon Weekly number-one singles
Billboard Japan Hot 100 number-one singles